Zhiuli Shartava (March 7, 1944 – September 27, 1993) was a Georgian politician and the Head of the Council of Ministers of the Autonomous Republic of Abkhazia who was killed by Abkhaz militants during the ethnic cleansing of Georgians in Abkhazia in 1993.

Biography
Shartava was born on March 7, 1944, in Sukhumi, Abkhaz ASSR. An engineer by education, he was elected to the Parliament of Georgia in 1992. Shartava chaired the Council of Ministers and the Council of Self-Defence of Autonomous Republic of Abkhazia during the Georgian-Abkhazian War in 1993. When the city of Sukhumi fell to the Abkhazian separatist forces on September 27, 1993, Shartava with other members of the Abkhaz Government (Guram Gabiskiria, Raul Eshba, Alexander Berulava, Mamia Alasania, Sumbat Saakian, Misha Kokaia and others) refused to flee and were captured by the Abkhaz militants. Initially they were promised safety, however Shartava and others from the Council of Ministers were killed by the militants and according to UN report Shartava was tortured.
In 2005, American journalist Malcolm Linton displayed his photo materials taken during the war in Abkhazia at the art gallery in Tbilisi, where Shartavas body was identified among the pile of corpses, clearly visible on one of the photographs. On video materials taken during the capture of Sukhumi by the militants, Shartava is carried out from the Government building and physically assaulted, after which he was forced into the van and taken to the outskirts of Sukhumi where he was killed with other Georgian and Abkhaz members of the government and their staff. Shartava's body was handed over to the Georgian side and was buried in the western Georgian city of Senaki. In 1994, Shartava was officially honored as the National Hero of Georgia posthumously in 2004.

See also 
Ethnic cleansing of Georgians in Abkhazia
Sukhumi Massacre

References

External links

Government of Abkhazia (-in-exile) (right-click to open file)

Assassinated Abkhazian politicians
Ethnic cleansing of Georgians in Abkhazia
National Heroes of Georgia
1944 births
1993 deaths
Members of the Parliament of Georgia
Prime Ministers of Abkhazia
Abkhaz–Georgian conflict
Abkhazian murder victims
1993 in Georgia (country)
People from Sukhumi
20th-century politicians from Georgia (country)